David Sprüngli (20 October 1776 – 14 February 1862) was a Swiss businessman, prominent in Zürich. There, in 1836, he established David Sprüngli & Son, a confectioners that is today known as Confiserie Sprüngli.

Early life 
Sprüngli was born in Andelfingen, a municipality of Zürich, Switzerland, to Hans Heinrich Sprüngli and Elisabetha Karrer.

Career 
In 1819, Sprüngli, then a poor journeyman baker, joined a locally well-established Zürichsugar bakery. When his boss died, in 1836, he bought the business from his widow.

In 1836, Sprüngli purchased a house and shop on Zürich's Marktgasse and founded David Sprüngli & Son with Rudolf.

Lindt & Sprüngli, a partnership between Rodolphe Lindt and David Sprüngli, began in 1845, the same year David Sprüngli & Son moved to Zürich's Paradeplatz.

Personal life 
In 1804, Sprüngli married Regula Rosenberger. He remarried, in 1812, to Katharina Schwarz, with whom he had sons David Sprüngli-Schmidlin (born 1814) and Rudolf Sprüngli-Ammann (born 1816).

Death 
Sprüngli died in 1862, aged 85.

References 

1776 births
1862 deaths
Confectioners
People from Andelfingen District
Swiss businesspeople